Chris Telfer is a former Republican and current Independent Party of Oregon politician and Certified Public Accountant in Bend, Oregon, United States.

Telfer serves on the Bend City Council, and was elected to the Oregon State Senate in the November 2008 elections, to succeed outgoing Senator Ben Westlund. Hers was the only seat that changed parties in the Senate in that election cycle; her campaign spent $300,000 to opponent Maren Lundgren's $12,000. The shift, however, left Democrats with an 18-12 majority, allowing them to pass increases to taxes and fees without Republican support. (A 1996 law requires a 3/5 supermajority in both houses of the Oregon Legislative Assembly for such measures.)

Telfer has lived in Bend since 1977. She has two daughters.

She earned a bachelor's degree at the University of Denver, and did post-graduate work at Franklin University and the University of Oregon. She has taught at Central Oregon Community College and served as vice-chair on the Bend Development Board.

In 2010, Telfer filed for the special election for Oregon State Treasurer, to complete the term of Ben Westlund, who died in office, but lost to Democratic incumbent Ted Wheeler in the November general election.

In the Republican primary of the 2012 legislative elections, Telfer was defeated by Tim Knopp, a former state Representative and vice president of the Central Oregon Builders Association.

She became the Oregon Lottery Commissioner. In 2016, she won the Independent Party of Oregon's nomination for Treasurer of Oregon. She lost in the general election to Tobias Read.

References

External links 

Republican Party Oregon state senators
Politicians from Bend, Oregon
University of Denver alumni
Franklin University alumni
University of Oregon alumni
Women state legislators in Oregon
Oregon city council members
Living people
Independent Party of Oregon politicians
21st-century American politicians
21st-century American women politicians
Year of birth missing (living people)
Women city councillors in Oregon